Andrea Weiss may refer to:
 Andrea Weiss (rabbi)
 Andrea Weiss (filmmaker)